The 1973 Dutch Open – Men's singles was an event of the 1973 Dutch Open tennis tournament played on outdoor clay courts in Hilversum, Netherlands between 16 July and 22 July 1973. John Cooper was the defending champion, but did not compete in this edition. Tom Okker won the singles title, defeating Andrés Gimeno in the final 2–6, 6–4, 6–4, 6–7, 6–3.

Draw

Finals

Top half

Bottom half

References

External links
 ATP main draw
 ITF tournament edition details (men)

Dutch Open (tennis)
1973 Grand Prix (tennis)